Sir George Gough Arbuthnot (28 August 1848 – 3 May 1929) was a businessman and civic leader in British India.

Arbuthnot, the son of Archibald Francis Arbuthnot (son of Sir William Arbuthnot, 1st Baronet) and Gertrude Sophia Gough was six times a member of the Madras Legislative Council. He was seven times made chairman of the Madras Chamber of Commerce, several times President of the board of directors of the Bank of Madras, and in 1900 became chairman of the Famine Relief Fund. Grandson of a Baronet, he was made a Knight Bachelor on 10 December 1901 for services to the British Empire.

He became partner of Arbuthnot & Co of Madras 1871 and was senior partner in the firm at the time of its spectacular crash in 1906, as a result of which he was sentenced to 18 months rigorous imprisonment. The charges against him were (1) Cheating in respect of a  fixed deposit in the name of the Rajah Krishna Badahur; (2) breach of trust respecting the Madras Equitable Assurance Society; and (3) breach of trust in misappropriating the funds of Arbuthnot's Industrials.

On 9 September 1873, Arbuthnot married Isabella Albinia Boyle, daughter of Richard Cavendish Boyle, the son of the 8th Earl of Cork. They had two daughters.

References

External links

1848 births
1929 deaths
George Gough Arbuthnot
Members of the Madras Legislative Council
British white-collar criminals
Businesspeople from Chennai
Knights Bachelor
Scottish bankers
Scottish businesspeople
British people in colonial India